Dixie is an unincorporated community in Baker County, Oregon, United States. Dixie was so-named because it is near the confluence of the Burnt River and Dixie Creek, which in turn was named for the many gold miners from the U.S. South (nicknamed "Dixie") who worked on the creek. Dixie post office was opened in 1913 and closed in 1924. The post office was near the railroad along the Burnt River rather than in the mining area.

References

Unincorporated communities in Baker County, Oregon
1913 establishments in Oregon
Unincorporated communities in Oregon